Police Aur Mujrim is a 1992 Indian Hindi-language action film produced and directed by K.C. Bokadia. It stars Raaj Kumar, Vinod Khanna, Meenakshi Seshadri and Nagma in pivotal roles.

Plot 
Veer Bahadur Singh, Police Commissioner of Bombay lives with his wife, Sharda and their only daughter. When police arrest two notorious goon Shera and Jaaga, their leader Banarsi kidnaps Commissioner's daughter Jyoti. Corrupt Home Minister supports the infamous gang. DSP Vishal Khanna finally saves her but the gang decide to destroy Veer Bahadur's family.

Cast
 Raaj Kumar as Police Commissioner Veer Bahadur Singh
 Vinod Khanna as DSP Vishal Khanna
 Meenakshi Seshadri as Kiran
 Nagma as Meena Khanna
 Avinash Wadhavan as Rakesh Pal
 Charan Raj as Banarsi Das
 Joginder as Jagga
 Sher Khan as Shera
 Mahavir Shah as Sanga
 Sadashiv Amrapurkar as Dharam Pal

Soundtrack

References

External links

1990s Hindi-language films
1992 films
Films scored by Bappi Lahiri
Indian romantic action films
Indian crime action films
Films directed by K. C. Bokadia
1992 crime films
Hindi-language crime films